Live Radar is a live EP by The Watchmen.

Following the Canadian release of their fourth studio album, Silent Radar on March 31, 1998, the official album release party came as a live show by the band which was broadcast over the Internet on Thursday April 2, 1998. The webcast was a live show from the Horseshoe Tavern in Toronto.

This concert was recorded and four songs were offered to those who purchased the Silent Radar CD. Included with the initial release of the CD was a white card which contained "CD Active" Instructions to the album's secret website. Attached to this card was a coupon which could be mailed back to the band and the sender would receive a free live EP in the mail called Live Radar. Only those who sent back the card received the bonus CD.

The cardboard sleeve that houses the CD is marked "From Us To You...".

Track listing
"Say Something" (live) - 5:01
"Silent Radar" (live) - 4:10
"Brighter Hell" (live) - 6:25
"Stereo" (live) - 4:37

All songs written by The Watchmen, Lyrics by Joey Serlin/Daniel Greaves.

Album credits

Personnel
Sammy Kohn - Drums, Percussion, Vocals
Ken Tizzard - Bass, Vocals
Daniel Greaves - Lead Vocals, Piano, Harmonica
Joey Serlin - Guitars, Vocals

Production
Recorded live at the Horseshoe Tavern, Toronto, ON, April 2, 1998
Recorded by Live Wire Remote Recorders
Mixed and Engineered by Doug McClement
Live Sound by Neil Cameron

References
 Liner notes from The Watchmen: Silent Radar.
The Watchmen Bio
Watchmen Online With Fans
Good Times For Watchmen
New Times For Watchmen

CRIA Searchable Database

The Watchmen (band) albums
1998 EPs
1998 live albums
Live EPs
Albums recorded at the Horseshoe Tavern